This is a list of the main career statistics of tennis player Nikolay Davydenko.

Significant finals

Year-end championship finals

Singles: 2 (1 title, 1 runner-up)

Masters 1000 finals

Singles: 3 (3 titles)

ATP career finals

Singles: 28 (21 titles, 7 runner-ups)

Doubles: 4 (2 titles, 2 runner-ups)

Team competition: 2 (1–1)

Singles performance timeline

1Held as Hamburg Masters till 2008.
2Held as Stuttgart Masters till 2001 and Madrid Masters from 2002–2008.

Doubles performance timeline

Head-to-head against other players
Davydenko's win-loss record against certain players who have been ranked World No. 10 or better is as follows:

Players who have been ranked World No. 1 are in boldface.

  Tomáš Berdych 9–3
  Fernando Verdasco 7–2
  Fernando González 6–0
  Jürgen Melzer 6–1
  Radek Štěpánek 6–4
  Rafael Nadal 6–5
  Tommy Robredo 5–2
  Mario Ančić 5–2
  David Nalbandian 5–7
 / Greg Rusedski 4–0
  Arnaud Clément 4–0
  Tommy Haas 4–1
  Dominik Hrbatý 4–1
  David Ferrer 4–2
  Mikhail Youzhny 4–2
  Marat Safin 4–4
  Ivan Ljubičić 4–4
  Andy Murray 4–6
  Robin Söderling 4–7
  Rainer Schüttler 3–1
  Juan Carlos Ferrero 3–2
  Thomas Johansson 3–2
 / Janko Tipsarević 3–2
  John Isner 3–3
  Juan Martín del Potro 3–4
  Sébastien Grosjean 2–0
  Nicolás Massú 2–0
  Jonas Björkman 2–1
  Mariano Puerta 2–1
  Stanislas Wawrinka 2–1
  Gaël Monfils 2–2
  Marcos Baghdatis 2–2
  Mardy Fish 2–3
  Marin Čilić 2–3
  Guillermo Cañas 2–3
  Paradorn Srichaphan 2–3
  Nicolás Lapentti 2–3
  Albert Costa 2–3
  Jo-Wilfried Tsonga 2–4
  Carlos Moyá 2–5
  Gilles Simon 2–5
  Gastón Gaudio 2–5
 / Novak Djokovic 2–6
  Richard Gasquet 2–6
  Roger Federer 2–19
  Àlex Corretja 1–0
  David Goffin 1–0
  Mark Philippoussis 1–0
  Marc Rosset 1–0
  Yevgeny Kafelnikov 1–1
  Jiří Novák 1–1
  Karol Kučera 1–1
  Félix Mantilla 1–1
  Andre Agassi 1–2
  Tim Henman 1–2
  Guillermo Coria 1–2
  Nicolás Almagro 1–3
  Nicolas Kiefer 1–3
  Andy Roddick 1–5
  James Blake 1–7
  Grigor Dimitrov 0–1
  Richard Krajicek 0–1
  Joachim Johansson 0–1
  Todd Martin 0–1
  Patrick Rafter 0–1
  Milos Raonic 0–1
  Gustavo Kuerten 0–2
  Kei Nishikori 0–2
  Lleyton Hewitt 0–4

 *As of March 19, 2017.

Top 10 wins per season

Wins over top 10s per season

ATP Tour career earnings

* As of March 18, 2013.

Russian tournament timeline

External links
 
 
 

Davydenko, Nikolay
Russia sport-related lists